Marie Bouzková defeated Anastasia Potapova in the final, 6–0, 6–3 to win the singles tennis title at the 2022 Prague Open. It was her maiden WTA Tour title.

Barbora Krejčíková was the defending champion, but lost in the second round to Nao Hibino.

Seeds

Draw

Finals

Top half

Bottom half

Qualifying

Seeds

Qualifiers

Lucky losers

Qualifying draw

First qualifier

Second qualifier

Third qualifier

Fourth qualifier

Fifth qualifier

Sixth qualifier

References

External links
Main draw
Qualifying draw

2022 WTA Tour
2022 Prague Open - 1